Dance All Night is the second single released by the Southern Hip Hop group Poison Clan in 1990 for their debut album 2 Low Life Muthas. The song is one of the group's most successful singles peaking at #14 on the Hot Rap Singles chart and #51 on the Hot R&B/Hip Hop Singles & Tracks chart. The song is fast paced and features the signature Miami Bass sound that was pioneered by Poison Clan's labelmates The 2 Live Crew. This song also has the distinction of being the only Poison Clan single that was not edited for content due to being the only truly clean song Poison Clan would ever record as there are no profanities anywhere in the entire song. Along with a 12-inch single and CD maxi-single, a music video was released for the song. The song would later appear on the group's 1999 greatest hits release The Best of JT Money & Poison Clan. The opening riff from Isaac Hayes' iconic Theme from Shaft is sampled very prominently throughout the entire song.

References

Poison Clan songs
1990 songs
1990 singles